Deroplatys cordata is a species of praying mantis in the family Deroplatyidae.

This "dead leaf mantis" species is native to Southeast Asia.

See also
 
 List of mantis genera and species

References

corodata
Mantodea of Southeast Asia
Insects described in 1798